Bromochlorofluoroiodomethane is a hypothetical haloalkane with all four stable halogen substituents present in it.

This compound can be seen as a methane molecule, whose four hydrogen atoms are each replaced with a different halogen atom. As the mirror images of this molecule are not superimposable, the molecule has two enantiomers.  As one of the simplest such molecules, it is often cited as the prototypical chiral compound. However, since there is no synthetic route known to produce bromochlorofluoroiodomethane, the related simple chiral compound bromochlorofluoromethane is used instead when such a compound is required for research.

References 

Halomethanes
Hypothetical chemical compounds
Chirality